David Kramer is an American entertainment industry executive and talent agent, currently serving as president of United Talent Agency.

Early life and education
Kramer was born in Tallahassee, Florida. He studied journalism at the University of Georgia, graduating from the Henry W. Grady College of Journalism and Mass Communication in 1990. While in school, he completed an internship for the Georgia Film Commission, and served as an office production assistant for the film Murder in Mississippi (1990). Kramer earned his master's degree from the University of Southern California in 1992, through the USC School of Cinematic Arts Peter Stark Producing Program.

Career
Kramer's career with United Talent Agency (UTA) began in 1992, working in the agency's mailroom and later becoming assistant to co-founder Peter Benedek. He became an agent in the motion picture literary department and was named a partner in 2002. He was then appointed to the board of directors in 2008.

Kramer and Jay Sures held managing director roles starting in 2010. Both became co-presidents in September 2017. Kramer leads the agency's motion picture group, which focuses on areas including film finance, media rights, production, and talent. He also heads UTA's comedy touring, endorsement, licensing, and publishing efforts. In September 2022 Kramer was named president of UTA.

In 2017, Kramer and Sures, along with UTA's chief executive officer, Jeremy Zimmer, ranked number 33 on The Hollywood Reporter list of the 100 "most powerful people in entertainment", in addition to earning a spot on The New York Observer 2017 list of "Content Kings".

Throughout his career as a talent agent, Kramer has represented Judd Apatow, John August, Brad Bird, Jonathan Dayton and Valerie Faris, Dan Futterman, Michael Goldenberg, Curtis Hanson, Rick Jaffa and Amanda Silver, Charlie Kaufman, Ehren Kruger, Roger Kumble, and Robin Swicord.

Personal life
Kramer joined the Jonsson Comprehensive Cancer Center's board of directors in 2009, and continues to serve. He was appointed to the advisory board of the Harold Ramis Film School, opened by The Second City, in early 2016. Kramer was appointed to the advisory board for the Peabody Award program, which is presented by the University of Georgia's Henry W. Grady College of Journalism and Mass Communication, in 2017. In 2018, he joined the Lincoln Center for Performing Arts Corporate Fund's Media and Entertainment Council and co-chaired their inaugural event, which featured performances by Patina Miller, Demetri Martin and Michelle Wolf.

References

1960s births
Living people
American talent agents
20th-century American Jews
People from Tallahassee, Florida
University of Georgia
USC School of Cinematic Arts alumni
21st-century American Jews